The Edward Aleander Kelley Hackett House is a historic Craftsman-style house in the Pico-Union neighborhood of Los Angeles, California.  Built in 1901, the house was added to the National Register of Historic Places in May 2003 based on its well-preserved Craftsman architecture.

It was built around 1904, as possibly the first house built on Westlake Avenue between Alvarado Street and Pico Boulevard.  It is a two-and-a-half-story early Arts and Crafts-style house.

See also
 List of Registered Historic Places in Los Angeles

References

Houses on the National Register of Historic Places in Los Angeles
Houses completed in 1904
Arts and Crafts architecture
Pico-Union, Los Angeles